Rusanovo is a rural locality (a selo) in Novokhopyorsk, Novokhopyorsky District, Voronezh Oblast, Russia. The population was 444 as of 2010. There are 2 streets.

Geography 
Rusanovo is located 14 km west of Novokhopyorsk (the district's administrative centre) by road. Kocherga is the nearest rural locality.

References 

Populated places in Novokhopyorsky District